Pekka Juha Markkanen (born 28 May 1967) is a Finnish former professional basketball player. He was named the Finnish Basketball Player of the Year, by Finnish sports journalists, in 1989, 1993, and 1996.

College career
Markkanen played college basketball at the University of Kansas, with the Kansas Jayhawks (1989–1990).

Professional career
During his pro club career, Markkanen won three Finnish League championships, in 1987, 1997, and 1998. He was named the Finnish League's Finnish Player of the Year, in 1989.

National team career
Markkanen had 129 caps (games played) with the senior Finnish national basketball team.

Personal life
Markkanen is the father of Utah Jazz basketball player Lauri Markkanen and professional football player Eero Markkanen, formerly on Real Madrid Castilla. His third son Miikka, also played basketball, before retiring early due to injuries. The boys' mother and Markkanen's ex-wife Riikka (née Ellonen), was also a basketball player.

References

External links 
 Finnish League profile

1967 births
Living people
Brose Bamberg players
Centers (basketball)
Finnish expatriate basketball people in the United States
Finnish men's basketball players
Kansas Jayhawks men's basketball players
Kataja BC players
SLUC Nancy Basket players
Sportspeople from Pori
Torpan Pojat players
ZTE KK players